The 2018–19 UConn Huskies men's basketball team represented the University of Connecticut in the 2018–19 NCAA Division I men's basketball season. The Huskies were led by first-year head coach Dan Hurley and participated as members of the American Athletic Conference. The Huskies split their home games between the XL Center in Hartford, Connecticut, and the Harry A. Gampel Pavilion on the UConn campus in Storrs, Connecticut. They finished the season 16–17, 6–12 in AAC play to finish in a tie for ninth place. They defeated South Florida in the first round of the AAC tournament before losing in the quarterfinals to Houston.

Previous season 
The Huskies finished the 2017–18 season 14–18, 7–11 in AAC play to finish in eighth place. They lost in the first round of the AAC tournament to SMU.

The school announced on January 26, 2018 that the NCAA was investigating recruitment of at least three basketball players for possible recruiting violations. On March 10, the school fired head coach Kevin Ollie for just cause related to the NCAA investigation. On March 22, 2018, it was announced that the school had hired Rhode Island head coach Dan Hurley as coach.

Offseason

Departures

Incoming transfers

2018 recruiting class

2019 Recruiting class

Roster

Akok Akok joined the team as a redshirt walkon for the spring semester.

Schedule and results

|-
!colspan=12 style=|Exhibition

|-
!colspan=12 style=|Non-conference regular season

|-
!colspan=12 style=| AAC regular season
|-

|-
!colspan=12 style=|AAC Tournament

References

UConn Huskies men's basketball seasons
Connecticut
Connecticut Huskies men's basketball
Connecticut Huskies men's basketball